Nezamabad (also Romanized as Nez̧āmābād; also known as Dozd-e Lag, Ḩeşāmābād, and Hez̧āmābād) is a village in Hendudur Rural District, Sarband District, Shazand County, Markazi Province, Iran. At the 2006 census, its population was 35, in 5 families.

References 

Populated places in Shazand County